American singer Kelly Rowland has released four studio albums, two compilation albums and a box set, four extended plays, three video albums and DVDs, 45 official, featuring, charity and promotional singles, and 55 music videos. She began her career in 1997 with one of the best-selling girl groups, Destiny's Child, who have sold around 60 million records worldwide.

During the hiatus of Destiny's Child, Rowland released her debut solo album, Simply Deep (2002), on Columbia Records. It included her worldwide number-one single "Dilemma" with rapper Nelly, which spent ten consecutive weeks atop the US Billboard Hot 100. The album's other singles include "Stole", "Can't Nobody" and "Train on a Track". "Stole" peaked in the top 30 of the Billboard Hot 100, and the top five in most other regions, including the United Kingdom, where it reached number two. More than 2.5 million copies of the album were sold worldwide. It was subsequently certified platinum in the UK and gold in Australia, Ireland, New Zealand and the United States.

After the disbandment of Destiny's Child in 2006, Rowland was featured on Trina's top-twenty single, "Here We Go". Her second studio album, Ms. Kelly, was released in 2007 and debuted at number six on the US Billboard 200. It featured the singles "Like This", "Work", "Ghetto" and "Daylight". "Like This" peaked in the top thirty of the Billboard Hot 100 and top five in Ireland and the UK. "Work" reached the top ten in several countries including Australia, Italy, New Zealand, Switzerland and the UK. Ms. Kelly was considerably less successful than its predecessor, failing to earn any chart certificates, and Columbia subsequently ended their contract with Rowland.

Between 2009 and 2011, Rowland was featured on a number of commercially successful singles by European artists Tiziano Ferro, David Guetta, Tinie Tempah and Alex Gaudino. Her collaboration with Guetta, "When Love Takes Over", became a worldwide number-one hit. She later signed a new record deal with Universal Motown Records, and released her third studio album, Here I Am (2011). It debuted at number three on the Billboard 200 and produced the singles "Commander", "Rose Colored Glasses", "Forever and a Day", "Motivation", "Lay It on Me" and "Down for Whatever". "Commander" reached the top ten in several charts worldwide, and "Motivation" topped the US Hot R&B/Hip-Hop Songs chart for seven weeks and was certified 2× Platinum by the RIAA. Rowland's fourth studio album, Talk a Good Game, was released in 2013 through Republic Records. It debuted at number four on the Billboard 200 and included the singles "Kisses Down Low", which was certified gold in the US, and "Dirty Laundry".

Albums

Studio albums

Box sets and compilations

Extended plays

Singles

As a lead artist

As a featured artist

Charity single

Promotional singles

Other charted songs

Guest appearances

See also
 Destiny's Child discography
 Kelly Rowland videography
 List of songs recorded by Kelly Rowland
 List of artists by number of UK Singles Chart number ones

References

Notes

Citations

External links
 
 

Discographies of American artists
Rhythm and blues discographies
Discography
Soul music discographies